"A Pop Song Saved My Life" is a song by Australian band Lo-Tel. It was released in September 2000 as the third single from the band's debut studio album Planet of the Stereos. The song peaked at number 75 in Australia.

Track listing
CD single (MATTCD107)
 "A Pop Song Saved My Life" - 3:35
 "Replaced By Vinyl" -3:52
 "www.writersblock.com" - 3:32
 "Teenager of the Year"  (acoustic version) - 4:36
 "Teenager of the Year"  (video clip)  - 4:21

Charts

References

1999 songs
2000 singles
Lo-Tel songs